Lyme Handley, sometimes known as Lyme, is a small civil parish in between Disley and Stockport, in the unitary authority of Cheshire East and the ceremonial county of  Cheshire, England. According to the 2001 census, it had a population of 151.

It is also greenbelt area on the suburbs of Greater Manchester, attracting many visitors in the summer months for walking and picnics and in winter for sledging. The most famous feature of Lyme is Lyme Park, a Tudor house with gardens created in the 1720s. This was made most famous when it featured as Mr Darcy's house in the BBC dramatisation of Pride and Prejudice. The three-storey house has  of well-maintained Victorian era gardens and is also open to visitors for guided tours of the house, which contains a large collection of English clocks.

The rest of the area consists of small farms which were all once part of the Handley estate but parcelled off at the turn of the 20th century.  These mostly farm sheep with some cattle.  In the past Lyme Handley had its own flax mill, providing a use for a crop other than grass that could be grown on a relatively infertile soil type; although the mill remains, it is no longer functional.

See also

Listed buildings in Lyme Handley

References

Civil parishes in Cheshire
Towns and villages of the Peak District